Măiestrit is a re-recording of the 2000 album Măiastru Sfetnic by Negură Bunget. Released on March 15, 2010, on Lupus Lounge/Prophecy Productions, it contained the last studio recordings of the band's classic line-up (Hupogrammos, Sol Faur, Negru). The album included previously unreleased acoustic material.

Track listing 
 All songs written and arranged by Negură Bunget.
 "Vremea locului sortit" – 07:38
 "În-zvîcnirea apusului" – 10:03
 "A-vînt în abis" – 06:14
 "Al locului" – 10:26
 "Bruiestru" – 09:45
 "Plecăciunea morții" – 11:12
 "A-vînt în abis (Acoustic Version)" – 08:22
 "Plecăciunea morții (Acoustic Version)" – 09:45

Personnel
 Hupogrammos - vocals, guitars, keyboards
 Sol Faur - guitars
 Negru - drums

Additional personnel
 Arioch - bass guitar, engineering
 Martin Koller - producer
 Hupogrammos - producer, engineering, mixing
 Sol Faur - producer, engineering, mixing
 Dan Florin Spataru (Encoilmark) – artwork, art direction, design, cover design, photography
 Dajana Winkel - photography

External links
 

Negură Bunget albums
2010 albums
Concept albums